The first Battle of Herdonia was fought in 212 BC during the Second Punic War between Hannibal's Carthaginian army and Roman forces led by Praetor Gnaeus Fulvius Flaccus, brother of the consul. The Roman army was destroyed, leaving Apulia free of Romans for the year.

Prelude
In 212 BC, Hannibal destroyed the Roman army in Campania under the command of Marcus Centenius in the Battle of the Silarus. He then received news from Apulian envoys of a Roman army under Flaccus that was easy prey owing to its low discipline and lack of awareness. Sensing an opportunity for another quick victory, Hannibal marched east into Apulia.

Battle
Fulvius and his army had had a rather easy time in Apulia, and the Romans were unaware of Hannibal's presence until he was within the immediate area of Herdonia. Fulvius is said to have become careless from his easy successes and his army was also weighted down with loot. Fulvius accepted battle on Hannibal's offer at the behest of his extremely eager soldiers. The Romans had about 18,000 men available.

Hannibal deployed his forces on the plain outside his camp, while sending about 3,000 light infantry to his extreme left flank to effect a surprise attack from the woodlands and farms located in that direction. Hannibal also sent out 2,000 Numidian cavalry to take control of the roads in the rear of Fulvius' army, thus cutting off all escape routes. Flaccus did not detect the deployments of the Carthaginians. Hannibal's army overwhelmed the Roman legions almost at once. Fulvius immediately fled the field with 200 cavalry as Hannibal's attacks came from the front, behind, and to both sides. Roughly 2,000 Romans are said to have survived the battle.

Aftermath
In the span of a few weeks, Hannibal had killed 31,000 Roman and allied soldiers in two battles in Campania and Apulia. After the Herdonia battle, Hannibal marched south towards Tarentum, where the Romans were besieged in the citadel while the town had fallen to Carthaginian allies earlier in 212 BC. The Roman senate decided to raise four new legions to send to Apulia. The Roman consuls then marched nearer to Capua, intent on blockading the city totally.

The reason for Hannibal's retreat south has been a source of puzzlement for some authors. They have speculated that Hannibal had retired to rest his army and give the wounded a chance to recover after three hard-fought battles and rapid marches.

See also
 Second Battle of Herdonia (210 BC)

References

Bibliography
 

Herdonia (212 BC)
Herdonia 212 BC
Herdonia
Herdonia (212 BC)
Ancient Apulia